Katie Baldwin is an American printmaker and book artist living in Huntsville, Alabama. She is currently an Assistant Professor at the University of Alabama in Huntsville. She received her Bachelor of Fine Arts from Evergreen State College in Olympia, Washington and her Master of Fine Arts from the University of the Arts (Philadelphia). She served as a Victor Hammer Fellow at Wells College from 2011-2013. Baldwin produced the book Treasure at Women's Studio Workshop.

Exhibitions
Katie Baldwin's books and prints are included in many collections. In 2015 she participated in WOOD + PAPER + BOX, A PROJECT INSPIRED BY MOKUHANGA, by Katie Baldwin, Mariko Jesse, and Yoonmi Nam, a show by three artists who met as artist residents on Awaji Island, Japan.

With Nick Satinover, an assistant professor at Middle Tennessee State University, she presented With/In a Valley at multiple locations, including Biggin Gallery at Auburn University. In Huntsville, Alabama, they displayed prints and drawings inspired by the Tennessee Valley.

She was the juror of Fresh Ink 2016 at the Wonderfair gallery in Lawrence, Kansas.
There are Two Stories Here was an exhibition of new works by Katie Baldwin at The Print Center, a show made possible by special project support from the Edna W. Andrade Fund of The Philadelphia Foundation. In 2012 her prints shown in Labors of love by Edna Andrade and Katie Baldwin at The Print Center, were based on her travels in Japan and were printed at the Wells Book Art Center.

A 5 x 5 foot unique image print by Katie Baldwin, The River Parcenta (2010), with mokuhanga (people and snake) created with screenprint, felted wool, spray paint, cut paper and mica, printed and published by the artist, was installed at the Mokuhanga International exhibition. She also exhibited at the Icebox Project Space in Philadelphia, the San Francisco Center for the Book, and Gedai University in Tokyo, Japan.

Other selected exhibitions include a solo show at the Delaware Center for the Contemporary Arts, Wilmington, Delaware; I'll Cut ThrU: Pochoirs, Carvings, and Other Cuttings, The Center for Book Arts, New York; DIC Square in Nichonbashi; Chūō, Tokyo; Space 1026 in Philadelphia, Pennsylvania, and Miejska Galeria in Lodz, Poland.

Teaching, awards, and residencies
Baldwin has travelled and taught internationally and has received awards as an artist-in-residence. She is a member of the printmakers' collective, Shift Lab. Katie Baldwin taught Mokuhanga: Traditional Japanese Water-based Woodblock Printing for Paper and Book Intensive in 2017. She spoke to the students of the Book Arts program of the University of Alabama in 2017.

References

External links 
 Katie Baldwin website: http://www.katieameliabaldwin.com/
   

Living people
American women printmakers
University of the Arts (Philadelphia) alumni
Evergreen State College alumni
20th-century American printmakers
21st-century American printmakers
20th-century American women artists
21st-century American women artists
Year of birth missing (living people)